Beaverdam Creek is a tributary of the Wicomico River on the Eastern Shore of Maryland.  Parker Pond and Schumaker Pond were created by damming Beaverdam Creek.

Beaverdam Creek runs through the historic Salisbury City Park.

References

Tributaries of the Chesapeake Bay
Rivers of Wicomico County, Maryland
Rivers of Maryland